John Robert Brough (born 8 January 1973) is an English former professional footballer who made more than 200 appearances in the Football League for Shrewsbury Town, Hereford United and Cheltenham Town as a centre back. He is currently manager of Cirencester Town.

Playing career
Brough spent seven years with Cheltenham after joining from Hereford United at the start of season 1998–99, at the same time as Neil Grayson and David Norton. Brough made 208 appearances for Cheltenham in those seven years, scoring 14 goals. A strong centre back, Brough often found himself deployed as a successful makeshift centre forward. Brough scored the first and played a part in the second of two injury time goals that gave Cheltenham a 2–1 away victory over title rivals Rushden & Diamonds in the 1998–99 season which saw promotion to the Football League.
He joined Newport County from Aldershot Town in March 2006 and was released by Newport at the end of the 2006–07 season.

Managerial career
After retiring from professional football, Brough became Head of Youth for Cheltenham Town. In May 2013, he was appointed first team manager at Southern League side Bishop's Cleeve, replacing former boss Alex Sykes. Having served less than a season as manager at Bishop's Cleeve, he left the club to become manager at league rivals Cinderford Town in April 2014. In May 2016 he left to take over as manager at North Leigh. He left North Leigh in May 2018.

In December 2019 he was appointed manager of Cirencester Town.

References

1973 births
Living people
English footballers
Notts County F.C. players
Shrewsbury Town F.C. players
Telford United F.C. players
Hereford United F.C. players
Cheltenham Town F.C. players
Aldershot Town F.C. players
Newport County A.F.C. players
Bishop's Cleeve F.C. players
English Football League players
National League (English football) players
Cheltenham Town F.C. non-playing staff
English football managers
Bishop's Cleeve F.C. managers
Cinderford Town A.F.C. managers
North Leigh F.C. managers
Association football central defenders
Cirencester Town F.C. managers